Ninja is a song by French rapper Soprano, it was released on March 4, 2020 on YouTube.

Charts

References 

2020 songs
2020 singles
French songs